Groovin is the third album by rock band The Young Rascals. The album was released on July 31, 1967 and rose to #5 on the Billboard Top LPs chart, number 7 on the R&B chart, and number 2 in Canada. Eight of the songs were released on singles with the title track reaching number 1 on the Pop chart in the U.S.

History
This was the last album on which the band was billed as The Young Rascals; their next album, Once Upon a Dream, would be credited to simply The Rascals. The album began the Rascals' first forays into the psychedelic genre that they would explore further on Once Upon a Dream.

Eight of Groovins eleven songs were issued by Atlantic Records as single A- or B-sides.  The three songs specific to the album are "Find Somebody", "I Don't Love You Anymore", and the Rascals' cover of "A Place in the Sun". "If You Knew", upon its initial release as the B-side of the single "I've Been Lonely Too Long", was jointly credited to all the Rascals' members; the writing credit was changed upon the album's release. Atlantic Records was at first reluctant to release the title song as a single, but its popularity was such that Italian and Spanish versions were released on different sides of a subsequent single.

Flutist Hubert Laws is featured in a sessions role on the album's final track, "It's Love".

Booker T. & the MG's took a cover of "Groovin to the charts later in 1967 and the song "You Better Run" was later covered by Pat Benatar and was a hit for her in 1980.

Cover design
The front cover design was conceived (but not illustrated) by the Young Rascals' drummer Dino Danelli. The illustration was a work of his friend, Lynn Rubin.  Affixed to the front cover was one of two stickers indicating: "THIS LP HAS THE BIG HIT", followed by either "How Can I Be Sure" (as shown in the cover photo on the right) or "A Girl Like You" as both tracks climbed into the Top 10.

Reception

Writing for Allmusic, critic Bruce Eder wrote the album moved into the psychedelic genre while retaining a "soulful core". He called the album "their best of their entire history... but 'Groovin was only one small strong point on the album of the same name."

Track listing

Certifications
US-Gold (500,000 copies sold).

Personnel

The Rascals
 Felix Cavaliere – vocals, keyboards, organ
 Eddie Brigati – vocals, percussion
 Gene Cornish – guitar, vocals, bass, harmonica; percussion on "Groovin
 Dino Danelli – drums, percussion

Additional musicians
 David Brigati – vocals
 Hubert Laws – flute
 Chuck Rainey – bass guitar

Singles
"Groovin / "Sueño" (March 27, 1967) US: #1, UK: #8
"A Girl Like You" / "It's Love" (July 3, 1967) US: #10
"Groovin' (Italian version)" / "Groovin' (Spanish version)" (July 17, 1967; these remixes do not appear on the album)
"How Can I Be Sure" / "I'm So Happy Now" (August 28, 1967) US: #4

References

1967 albums
Atlantic Records albums
The Rascals albums
Albums produced by Felix Cavaliere
Albums produced by Eddie Brigati
Albums produced by Gene Cornish
Albums produced by Dino Danelli